The Virginia School Leaders Institute (VSLI) is a concept developed cooperatively in the Commonwealth of Virginia to provide a transition and mentoring relationship for new school leaders. The program is not a part of any required licensure program, but is developed to create optional experiential opportunities for new school leaders to assist them in their new role as school leaders. The effort is a cooperative venture between a consortium of nineteen school divisions and local universities, with Virginia Tech playing the major role in the fiscal operation. The operation of the institutes is also in cooperation with the outreach program aligned with the Hotel Roanoke, which is also part of the Virginia Tech effort.

References 

Virginia Tech
Education in Virginia